Kiska is a surname. Notable people with the surname include:

 Andrej Kiska (born 1963), former President of Slovakia
 Megan Kiska, American military officer 
 Peter Kiška (born 1981), Slovak footballer

Slovak-language surnames